Day of Serb Unity, Freedom and the National Flag is a state holiday that is celebrated on 15 September in Serbia and Republika Srpska. The holiday is symbolically established to be celebrated on the day when the breakthrough of the Macedonian Front is celebrated. It has been celebrated since 2020.

History 
The idea of a holiday in both countries (Serbia and Srpska) was unveiled by President Vučić, Prime Minister Brnabić, and the leaders of Republika Srpska in August 2020. It was decided that it would be put into further consideration about establishing it as a new statewide holiday.

On 10 September 2020, Srpska reached a decision on making the Day of Serb Unity, Freedom and the National Flag official, which made it a new holiday in Srpska.

A day later, on 11 September 2020, the Serbian government also made the day official, making it official in both Serbia and Srpska.

Festivities 
The purpose of establishing this holiday is to promote the unity of the Serbians of Serbia and Srpska. It also promotes the respect of the Serbian flags.[citation needed]

In other countries that have their own flag days, proper use and display of the flag can be found in state buildings and provincial buildings as a show of respect for the flag. The display of the flag in those countries follows state regulations. In Serbia, either the national or the civil flag may be flown. On September 11, the government of Serbia made the event a holiday, making it official in the country.

See also 
Serbia
Srpska
Srpska and Serbia 
Serbian flag
Srpska flag
Serbian holidays

References

External links 
http://www.politika.rs/scc/clanak/462495/Proboj-Solunskog-fronta-ne-sme-biti-zaboravljen
http://spc.rs/sr/dan_srpskog_jedinstva_slobode_nacionalne_zastave

Observances in Serbia
Observances in Bosnia and Herzegovina
Flag days